Group A of the 2015 Africa Cup of Nations was played from 17 January until 25 January in Equatorial Guinea. The group consisted of the hosts Equatorial Guinea, Burkina Faso, Gabon, and Congo. Congo and Equatorial Guinea advanced as group winners and runners-up respectively, while Gabon and Burkina Faso were eliminated.

Teams

Notes

Standings

In the quarter-finals:
Congo advanced to play DR Congo (runner-up of Group B).
Equatorial Guinea advanced to play Tunisia (winner of Group B).

Matches
All times local, WAT (UTC+1).

Equatorial Guinea vs Congo
The first goal of the tournament was scored by Emilio Nsue. Receiving a through ball from Kike, he slotted the ball low past the goalkeeper with his right foot from six yards out to open the scoring for the hosts after 16 minutes. Thievy Bifouma scored the equalizer for Congo with three minutes left, after being played in by Dominique Malonga, he slotted it low into the net from the right of the six yard box.

Burkina Faso vs Gabon
Pierre-Emerick Aubameyang opened the scoring in the 19th minute, as after his initial shot was saved, he collected the rebound and calmly slotted home from seven yards out with his right foot. Gabon sealed the win in the 72nd minute with Malick Evouna's header from Frédéric Bulot's cross.

Equatorial Guinea vs Burkina Faso
In the first goalless draw of the tournament, Burkina Faso hit the post twice, first through a free kick by Alain Traoré, then later when his shot was tipped to the post by Felipe Ovono.

Gabon vs Congo
Congo secured their first win in the Africa Cup of Nations since 1974, as Prince Oniangué scored the only goal in the 48th minute after the Gabon defence failed to clear a corner.

Gabon vs Equatorial Guinea
Equatorial Guinea took the lead in the 55th minute through Javier Balboa's penalty, awarded after he was brought down by Lloyd Palun. They sealed the win in the 86th minute, as Ibán converted the rebound after Emilio Nsue's shot was saved, confirming their qualification to the knockout stage and eliminating Gabon.

Congo vs Burkina Faso
Congo took the lead in the 51st minute, when Férébory Doré crossed for Thievy Bifouma to convert from close range. Burkina Faso equalized in the 86th minute, after Aristide Bancé scored from Issiaka Ouédraogo's cross, but Congo retook the lead one minute later, as from a Congo free kick, Burkina Faso goalkeeper Germain Sanou punched the ball and it hit Fabrice Ondama and went into the net. As a result, Congo qualified as group winners while Burkina Faso were eliminated.

References

External links
Orange Africa Cup Of Nations, Equatorial Guinea 2015, CAFonline.com

Group A